The Orizaba long-tailed shrew (Sorex orizabae) is a species of mammal in the family Soricidae. It is found in the states of Federal District, México, Michoacán, Morelos, Puebla, Tlaxcala, and Veracruz in Mexico. It is named after Pico de Orizaba, the highest mountain in Mexico.

References

Sorex
Endemic mammals of Mexico
Shrew, Orizaba
Least concern biota of North America
Mammals described in 1895